"If I Had a Hammer" is a song written by Pete Seeger and Lee Hays, later recorded by  Peter, Paul, and Mary, Trini Lopez, and Leonard Nimoy.

If I Had a Hammer may also refer to:

 "If I Had a Hammer", a different song by American Music Club from their 1994 album Mercury
 "If I Had a Hammer" (Hercules: The Legendary Journeys), a 1998 episode of Hercules: The Legendary Journeys
 If I Had a Hammer (film), a film by independent filmmaker Josh Becker
 "If I Had A Hammer" (CSI), the 21st episode of season 9 of CSI: Crime Scene Investigation
 "If I Had a Hammer", the 6th episode of season 4 of Dexter
 "Man-with-a-hammer syndrome", the cognitive bias otherwise known as law of the instrument